The buff-breasted buttonquail (Turnix olivii) is the largest and possibly the rarest of the buttonquail. This species is endemic to Cape York Peninsula, in Queensland, Australia.

Description
Both the tail and wings are short. The back is chestnut. The sides of the head are marked with chestnut on an otherwise plain gray head; while the breast is warm buff-colored. The painted buttonquail and the brown quail both coexist with this species. The buff-breasted is larger (and longer-legged) than either and is quite different from the all-dark quail. The painted species is almost totally mottled, with bold white spotting on the breast and no warm buff coloration. The most similar species to the buff-breasted is the chestnut-backed buttonquail, which does not overlap in the wild.

The notes are almost inaudible initially, then become gradually louder, higher-pitched and shorter until they are far-carrying. The males will respond with a deep, rapid  whistle. Other calls, perhaps in reaction to danger, include , a soft  and a loud .

Distribution and habitat
These birds favor lowland, subcoastal grasslands or woodlands. Reports describe this species as dependent on grassy woods made up of Melaleuca, Acacia, Alphitonia and Tristania.

Conservation status
They have been extirpated from large portions of their original range, probably due in part due to cattle overgrazing, sites made unsuitable by fire regimes and general habitat clearances to make way for human habitation.

Important Bird Areas
Sites identified by BirdLife International as being important for buff-breasted buttonquail conservation are the Iron and McIlwraith Ranges, and the Morehead River of Far North Queensland.

Behaviour
Very few people see the buff-breasted buttonquail due to its tiny range and inconspicuous disposition. They usually walk or run in areas where they are well camouflaged, almost never leaving the ground except when absolutely necessary. They are usually sedentary, but local movements have been recorded, probably in response to seasonal habitat changes.

Diet
Details of their diet are little known, but (like most buttonquail) they probably live off of insects and seeds, with sand used as a digestion aid.

Breeding
These birds are known to be solitary breeders. The breeding season is January through March. The nest is a shallow depression with a dome of grasses and a side entrance, which itself is lined with grasses and leaves. Usually the nest site is well obscured behind grasses, low scrubs or tussock. Two to four round eggs (usually 3) are laid. The eggs are whitish and speckled with chestnut, bluish-gray or black. The incubation period is unknown, but the male is thought to assume all incubation and chick-care activities. The young are precocial and nidifugous.

References

External links

 
 
 
 
 

buff-breasted buttonquail
Birds of Queensland
Endemic birds of Australia
Critically endangered fauna of Australia
buff-breasted buttonquail
Taxa named by Herbert C. Robinson